Kahnuj (also Romanized as Kahnūj; also known as Kenuj and Patakīgān) is a village in Asfyj Rural District, Asfyj District, Behabad County, Yazd Province, Iran. At the 2006 census, its population was 125, in 34 families.

References 

Populated places in Behabad County